Sam Haywood (born 16 April 1972) is a British pianist, based in London.

Early life and education 
Haywood was born in Brisbane, Australia to British parents. He grew up in the English Lake District and began playing the piano at the age of four. He studied with David Hartigan from Chetham's School of Music and at the age of 13 won second prize in the piano final of BBC Young Musician of the Year. In 1989 he was awarded the Julius Isserlis Scholarship by the Royal Philharmonic Society and moved to Vienna to study with Paul Badura-Skoda. He continued his studies with Maria Curcio at the Royal Academy of Music, after which he moved to Berlin.

Career 
His first CD for Hyperion was the piano works of Julius Isserlis, grandfather of Steven Isserlis, with whom Haywood has often collaborated. He also is a regular duo partner to the American violinist Joshua Bell, with whom he has toured extensively in USA and Europe. In celebration of Chopin's 200th anniversary, he recorded a CD of Chopin's piano music on the composer's own Pleyel instrument, part of the Cobbe Collection. In 2013 he made his US solo debut at the Kennedy Center in Washington DC as well as co-founding the Solent Music Festival in Lymington, Hampshire, with his wife Sophia Pagoni. He has written a children's opera, and Song of the Penguins for bassoon and piano.

Selected discography 
Julius Isserlis Piano Music for Hyperion

Composers in Love 

Joshua Bell Musical Gifts for Sony Masterworks

References

External links 
 Haywood's Website
 Solent Music Festival
 Memorystars

1972 births
Living people
Musicians from Brisbane
British classical pianists
20th-century classical pianists
21st-century classical pianists